Steve Charles may refer to:
 Steve Charles (footballer)
 Steve Charles (surgeon)
 Steve Charles, musician with Western Flyer